Abd Allah ibn Uthman, was the son of the third caliph Uthman and Ruqayya bint Muhammad. Born in Abyssinia, Abd Allah was the first grandson of the Islamic prophet Muhammad.

Biography
Mus'ab al-Zubayri narrated that when Uthman migrated to Abyssinia, he was accompanied by his wife Ruqayya bint Muhammad. A child named Abd Allah was born in the land of Abyssinia in 2 BH.

Abd Allah died after a rooster bit his eye in November 625 (Jumada al-Thani 4 AH) at the age of six. Muhammad led his funeral prayers.

References

Bibliography 

 

Companions of the Prophet
Burials at Jannat al-Baqī
Children of Rashidun caliphs
620 births
625 deaths
Banu Umayya
Child deaths